Feilding is a town in the Manawatū District of the North Island of New Zealand.  It is located on State Highway 54, 20 kilometres north of Palmerston North. The town is the seat of the Manawatū District Council.

Feilding has won the annual New Zealand's Most Beautiful Town award 15 times. It is an Edwardian-themed town, with the district plan encouraging buildings in the CBD to be built in that style.  The town is currently extending its CBD beautification featuring paving and planter boxes on the footpaths on the main streets in the CBD, including the realignment and beautification of Fergusson Street to the South Street entrance of Manfeild Park. 

The town is a service town for the surrounding farming district. The Feilding Saleyards has been a vital part of the wider Manawatū community for over 125 years. As transport systems improved and farming practices changed, the need for small, local saleyards all but disappeared, leaving few major selling complexes in New Zealand. Manawatū is a diverse and fertile farming area with high production, high stock-carrying capacity, and a stable climate. These factors make Feilding Saleyards a popular medium for many farmers. A unique aspect of Feilding Saleyards is their location in the centre of town.

The Manawatū Plains, on which the town is sited, are very fertile land, and as such it is a prosperous agricultural area. Being located on the floodplain of a major river has its problems, however, and in February 2004 the town suffered extensive flooding. In 2009 the Horizons Regional Council commissioned a new flood protection scheme to prevent extensive flooding in the future.

History

European settlement

The town was named after Colonel William H. A. Feilding, a director of the Emigrants and Colonists Aid Corporation Ltd. who negotiated the purchase of a 100,000 acre (400 km²) block of land from the Wellington provincial government in 1871. The first European settlers arrived from Great Britain on 22 January 1874.  

The Feilding Edwardian Project Inc. was established in September 1993 by local businesses with the aim of revitalising the central business area of Feilding. Many of the commercial buildings were built in the 1900s (Edwardian era) and have been restored and preserved over time. Feilding is home to a number of historic collections, buildings, monuments, and museums, including The Coach House Museum, St Johns Church, Feilding Club, Feilding Hotel, and Feilding & Districts Steam Rail Society.

Marae

Feilding has two marae, connected to the Iwi of Ngāti Kauwhata: Aorangi Marae and its Maniaihu meeting house; and Kauwhata Marae or Kai Iwi Pā and its Kauwhata meeting house.

In October 2020, the Government committed $1,248,067 from the Provincial Growth Fund to upgrade Kauwhata Marae and 5 others, creating 69 jobs.

Demographics 

The boundary of the urban area differs slightly from the aggregate of statistical units listed below.

Feilding had a population of 15,912 at the 2018 New Zealand census, an increase of 1,524 people (10.6%) since the 2013 census, and an increase of 2,340 people (17.2%) since the 2006 census. There were 6,003 households. There were 7,665 males and 8,247 females, giving a sex ratio of 0.93 males per female, with 3,234 people (20.3%) aged under 15 years, 2,805 (17.6%) aged 15 to 29, 6,531 (41.0%) aged 30 to 64, and 3,345 (21.0%) aged 65 or older.

Ethnicities were 87.0% European/Pākehā, 19.4% Māori, 2.5% Pacific peoples, 3.2% Asian, and 1.7% other ethnicities (totals add to more than 100% since people could identify with multiple ethnicities).

The proportion of people born overseas was 11.0%, compared with 27.1% nationally.

Although some people objected to giving their religion, 50.9% had no religion, 36.4% were Christian, 0.5% were Hindu, 0.3% were Muslim, 0.4% were Buddhist and 3.1% had other religions.

Of those at least 15 years old, 1,626 (12.8%) people had a bachelor or higher degree, and 3,294 (26.0%) people had no formal qualifications. The employment status of those at least 15 was that 5,970 (47.1%) people were employed full-time, 1,653 (13.0%) were part-time, and 429 (3.4%) were unemployed.

Economy
Employing about 30 people with a payroll of $1.5m in 2015, Proliant, an Iowa based firm privately held by the father and son team of Wally and Nix Lauridsen, constructed a $24m factory on the outskirts of Feilding for the production of a byproduct from cattle blood plasma, bovine serum albumin (BSA), which is used in pharmaceuticals, vaccines and medical research. Proliant produces about half of the world's BSA.

In the Manawatu District of the people aged 15 years or over:
 40% earn $20,000 or less (NZ 38.8%)
 14% earn more than $50,000 (NZ 16.2%)
 the unemployment rate is 3.8% (NZ 7.3%)
 73.4% of permanent private dwellings are owned with or without a mortgage by the occupant(s) (NZ 66.9%)

Features 
 One of New Zealand's main motor racing circuits, Manfeild, is located at the southern edge of the town.
 There is an active light aircraft airfield Feilding Aerodrome and is located at the eastern edge of the town.
 The depot of the Feilding and District Steam Rail Society is located in the town and it runs railway excursions from this base.
 Feilding's stock saleyards were once one of the largest in the southern hemisphere and are right in the central business area.
 Feilding railway station
 The Coach House Museum
 Focal Point Cinema Feilding
 There are no traffic lights and no parking meters

Education

Secondary schools
 Feilding High School

Primary and intermediate schools
It was established in 1964.
It was established in 1901. In 1937 Makino Road school closed and its 50 pupils were bussed to Lytton Street. Makino had been established in 1886 and its building was moved to Bluff Road, Rangiwahia.
It was established in 1874.

Sport and recreation

Sporting facilities include:

 Manfeild: Circuit Chris Amon motor racing, which holds the New Zealand Grand Prix
 Johnston Park rugby ground, home ground of the Feilding Rugby Football Club (the Feilding Yellows) and the Feilding Old Boys Oroua Rugby Football Club 
 Johnston Park lawn bowling club
 Feilding Golf Club
 Feilding Squash Club
 Makino Aquatic Centre

The Feilding Marathon started in 1955 and has been held every year since, making it one of the longest continuously run events.  It was organised for many years by the Feilding Marathon Club and more lately by the Feilding Moa Harriers Club.  The event is held in November and now incorporates the Roy Lamberton Memorial half-marathon event.

Notable people
Notable people from Feilding include:
 Murray Ball, kiwiana cartoonist who drew Footrot Flats
 Jed Brophy, actor, Dwarf Nori in The Hobbit trilogy

 Air Marshal Sir Charles Roderick Carr, KBE, CB, DFC, AFC, was born in Feilding and attended a primary school there
 Eddie Durie was born in Feilding
 Mason Durie, was born in Feilding
 Keith Elliott, recipient of the Victoria Cross medal, attended high school in Feilding
 Mihingarangi Forbes, journalist
 Sarah Hirini, New Zealand women's national rugby union team and sevens team
 Perry Harris, All Black and Manawatu rugby representative
 Hinerangitoariari, artist
 Michael Houstoun, concert pianist
 Glen Jackson, rugby union player and referee born in Feilding
 Sam McNicol, rugby union player, was born in Feilding
 W. H. Oliver, historian and poet, was born in Feilding
 Tom Scott, cartoonist
 Jesse Sergent, Olympic Cyclist
 Aaron Smith, All Black
 Glenn Standring, film director, was born in Feilding
 Barbara Stewart politician, New Zealand First member of Parliament
 Codie Taylor, All Black attended FAHS
 Simon van Velthooven, Olympic cyclist, America's Cup winner
 Mat Waghorn, winner of the 27th Karapoti Classic mountain bike event
 Adam Whitelock, New Zealand national rugby sevens team, attended FAHS
 George Whitelock, All Black, attended FAHS
 Luke Whitelock, All Black, attended FAHS
 Sam Whitelock, All Black, attended FAHS
 Peter Williams, attended FAHS

Groups
 Evermore popular musical group composed of Dann Hume, Jon Hume and Peter Hume

See also
Feilding Old Boys Oroua Rugby Football Club

References

External links
Official Feilding website

 
Manawatu District
Populated places in Manawatū-Whanganui